The Signature of All Things is a novel by Elizabeth Gilbert. It was originally published in 2013 and longlisted for the Baileys Women's Prize for Fiction.

Overview 
The story follows Alma Whittaker, daughter of a botanical explorer, as she comes into her own within the world of plants and science. As Alma’s careful studies of moss take her deeper into the mysteries of evolution, she starts a spiritual journey which spans the 19th Century.

Critical reception 
The reception to the book has been positive. Elizabeth Day of The Guardian praised the complex characters, calling "Alma's journey a universal one, despite anchoring her protagonist's life in a different time and sending her to the furthest corners of the unexplored earth." Barbara Kingsolver of The New York Times labelled it "a bracing homage to the many natures of genius and the inevitable progress of ideas, in a world that reveals its best truths to uncommonly patient minds."

References

External links 
 Official Website

2013 American novels
Novels set in the 19th century
Viking Press books